The Sweden cricket team toured Finland in August 2021 to play a four-match Twenty20 International (T20I) series. The matches were played at the Kerava National Cricket Ground in Kerava. Sweden travelled to Finland having played a series against Denmark the previous weekend. The two series were the first international action with the Swedish national team for their coach, former South African international cricketer Jonty Rhodes.

Finland took a 2–0 lead on the first day, before Sweden won both games on day two to share the series 2–2.

Squads

T20I series

1st T20I

2nd T20I

3rd T20I

4th T20I

References

External links
 Series home at ESPNcricinfo

Associate international cricket competitions in 2021